Northern Cape is one of the nine multi-member constituencies of the National Assembly of South Africa, the lower house of the Parliament of South Africa, the national legislature of South Africa. The constituency was established in 1994 when the National Assembly was established by the Interim Constitution following the end of Apartheid. It is conterminous with the province of Northern Cape. The constituency currently elects five of the 400 members of the National Assembly using the closed party-list proportional representation electoral system. At the 2019 general election it had 626,471 registered electors.

Electoral system
Northern Cape currently elects five of the 400 members of the National Assembly using the closed party-list proportional representation electoral system. Constituency seats are allocated using the largest remainder method with a Droop quota.

Election results

Summary

Detailed

2019
Results of the 2019 general election held on 8 May 2019:

The following candidates were elected:
Mirriam Kibi (ANC), Dali Mpofu (EFF), Gizella Opperman (DA), Ntaoleng Peacock (ANC) and Dikgang Stock (ANC).

2014
Results of the 2014 general election held on 7 May 2014:

The following candidates were elected:
Joyce Basson (ANC), Karen de Kock (DA), Patrick Mabilo (ANC), Johannes Raseriti Tau (ANC) and Sharome van Schalkwyk (ANC).

2009
Results of the 2009 general election held on 22 April 2009:

The following candidates were elected:
Tshoganetso Mpho Adolphina Gasebonwe (ANC), Tina Joemat-Pettersson (ANC), Andrew Louw (DA), Sanna Keikantseeng Molao (COPE) and Ebrahim Mohammed Sulliman (ANC).

2004
Results of the 2004 general election held on 14 April 2004:

The following candidates were elected:
Spetho Enoch Asiya (ANC), Johannes Jacobus Combrinck (ANC), Vytjie Mentor (ANC) and Adriaan Hermanus Nel (DA).

1999
Results of the 1999 general election held on 2 June 1999:

1994
Results of the 1994 general election held on between 26 and 29 April 1994:

References

National Assembly of South Africa constituencies
National Assembly of South Africa constituencies established in 1994
National Assembly constituency